Kafr Hamrah (also spelled Kfar Hamra) is a village in northern Syria, administratively part of the Aleppo Governorate, in the northwestern suburbs of Aleppo. Nearby localities include nahiya ("subdistrict") center Huraytan to the north, Anadan to the northwest and Maarat al-Atiq and Babis to the west. According to the Syria Central Bureau of Statistics (CBS), Kafr Hamrah had a population of 10,696 in the 2004 census.

At that time there was a very beautiful building structure in the village, with several rich families living in the village at that time. The villas that were built there were luxury Roman-style houses. At that time the families worked in the real estate industry. Several companies and industries were also active on site.

References

Populated places in Mount Simeon District